"Be Here Now" is a song by English rock band Basement. It is their single off of their fourth studio album, Beside Myself. It peaked at number 38 on the Billboard Mainstream Rock Songs chart in May 2019, and stayed on the chart for 3 weeks.

Background
The song is a single off of Basement's fourth studio album, Beside Myself, scheduled for release on October 12, 2018. The song was premiered ahead of the album release, exclusively on Billboard'''s website on October 2, 2018. The song was the third to be released ahead of the album, following the tracks "Disconnect" and "Stigmata".

Themes and composition
Lyrically, the song has been described as a "powerful meditation on the struggle for contentment." Vocalist and lyricist Andrew Fisher described the song as being about his efforts to try to do a better job of living in the moment:  Musically, the song was described by Billboard'' as a "melodic rocker" that "strikes a cozy balance between the grunge textures that used to rule alternative radio and classic emo influences". The song has a more somber and reflective sound to it, and was compared to the work of the band Jimmy Eat World.

Personnel
Basement
Andrew Fisher – lead vocals
Alex Henery – guitar, backing vocals
Ronan Crix – guitar
Duncan Stewart – bass
James Fisher - drums

Additional personnel
Colin Brittain - production
Rich Costey - mixing

Charts

References

2018 songs
2018 singles
Fueled by Ramen singles
Warner Records singles
Song recordings produced by Colin Brittain